Gaius Ummidius Quadratus Annianus Verus was a consul suffectus around the year 146 CE.

Family 
He was born in 110 to Gaius Ummidius Quadratus Sertorius Severus and Ummidia Quadratilla. However, it is possible that he  was adopted by Ummidia. Ummidius Quadratus married Annia Cornificia Faustina in 136, at age 26. They had three children, only two of whom are known by name: Marcus Ummidius Quadratus Annianus, and Ummidia Cornificia Antonia.

References 

Ummidii
110

Imperial Roman consuls
110 births